Dale Station is a railway station located in the village of Dale in Vaksdal municipality, Vestland county, Norway. The station is served by twelve daily departures per direction by the Bergen Commuter Rail operated by Vy Tog, as well by some express trains the night train to Oslo S. The station opened in 1883 as part of Vossebanen.

External links
 Dale at the Norwegian National Rail Administration

Railway stations in Vaksdal
Railway stations on Bergensbanen
Railway stations opened in 1883